Emly Cathedral, is a former cathedral in the Republic of Ireland. 
It was formerly in the Diocese of Emly, then the Archdiocese of Cashel and then the Diocese of Cashel and Waterford It was destroyed by fire in 1192, again in 1827 and by 1876 was completely disused.

Notes

Works cited
 

Anglican cathedrals in the Republic of Ireland
Religion in County Tipperary
History of County Tipperary
Former cathedrals in Ireland
Former churches in the Republic of Ireland